The third seeds John Bromwich and Adrian Quist defeated Gottfried von Cramm and Henner Henkel 7–5, 6–4, 6–0 in the final, to win the men's doubles tennis title at the 1938 Australian Championships.

This win marked the start of a record eight consecutive Australian Men's Doubles titles streak for the pair formed only recently at the request of the Australian Lawn
Tennis Association.

Seeds

  Don Budge /  Gene Mako (semifinals)
  Gottfried von Cramm /  Henner Henkel (final)
  John Bromwich /  Adrian Quist (champions)
  Jack Crawford /  Vivian McGrath (semifinals)

Draw

Draw

References

External links

 Sources for seedings

1938 in Australian tennis
Men's Doubles